Pressure-tolerant electronics (PTE) are electronic components or assemblies that can operate satisfactorily under high pressure (hyperbaric or hydrostatic, such as oil baths), without the need of a high pressure enclosure.

Typical uses include submarines and oil wells.

Components

References 

Electrical components
Electronics manufacturing